Mariánské Radčice is a municipality and village in Most District in the Ústí nad Labem Region of the Czech Republic. It has about 500 inhabitants.

Administrative parts
The area of extinct village of Libkovice is an administrative part of Mariánské Radčice.

Notable people
Antonín Kubálek (1935–2011), Czech-Canadian pianist

References

Villages in Most District